Eleanor Race née Stone (born November 19, 1970 in Cheshire, Connecticut) is an American field hockey player who made her international senior debut for the Women's National Team in 1991. She was a member of the team, that won the bronze medal at the 1994 World Cup in Dublin, Ireland.
She won a bronze medal at the 1995 Pan American Games.

Life 
She was a student at the Penn State University and played as a forward.

International Senior Tournaments
 1994 – World Cup, Dublin, Ireland (3rd)
 1995 – Pan American Games, Mar del Plata, Argentina (2nd)
 1995 – Champions Trophy, Mar del Plata, Argentina (3rd)
 1999 – Pan American Games, Winnipeg, Canada (2nd)
 2000 – Olympic Qualifying Tournament, Milton Keynes, England (6th)

References

 Profile on US Field Hockey

1970 births
Living people
American female field hockey players
Penn State Nittany Lions field hockey players
Pennsylvania State University alumni
People from Cheshire, Connecticut
Sportspeople from New Haven County, Connecticut
Pan American Games silver medalists for the United States
Pan American Games medalists in field hockey
Field hockey players at the 1995 Pan American Games
Field hockey players at the 1999 Pan American Games
Medalists at the 1995 Pan American Games
Medalists at the 1999 Pan American Games